Lima department was a department of Peru. It was formed by the territories of present-day Lima Region, Callao Region and Ica Region, and Casma Province, Huarmey Province and Santa Province, which later would be part of the La Costa Department.

Departments of Peru